Arbury Banks is a hill fort southwest of Ashwell, Hertfordshire, England.

It was probably first constructed during the late Bronze Age, 1000-700 BC. Excavations in the 1850s traced Arbury Banks' horseshoe-shaped ramparts and identified two opposed north-north-west and south-south-east entrances. Evidence was also discovered for several enclosures or buildings inside the fort.

Ardbury Banks has been suggested as a possible location for the Battle of Watling Street, where a small Roman force destroyed the army of Boudica.

The site is a scheduled monument.

Ordnance Survey grid reference:

References

External links
HertsDirect
The Megalithic Portal

Hill forts in Hertfordshire
Scheduled monuments in Hertfordshire
Boudica